Helena Fliśnik (22 January 1952 – 1 January 1999) was a Polish sprinter. She competed in the women's 4 × 100 metres relay at the 1972 Summer Olympics.

References

1952 births
1999 deaths
Athletes (track and field) at the 1972 Summer Olympics
Polish female sprinters
Olympic athletes of Poland
Place of birth missing
Olympic female sprinters
Universiade medalists in athletics (track and field)
Universiade bronze medalists for Poland